Our Latin Thing was a 1972 documentary film directed by Leon Gast about the burgeoning Latin music scene in New York City. It focused on a concert put together by the management of Fania Records at Manhattan's Cheetah nightclub featuring a group of Fania artists called the Fania All-Stars. The film was distributed by A&R Film Distributors headed by Alex Masucci, Fania Records founder Jerry Masucci's younger brother and subsequent Fania Records Vice President, and Ray Aviles.

References

External links

Films directed by Leon Gast
Documentary films about music and musicians
Documentary films about New York City
1972 films
Latin music
Hispanic and Latino American culture in New York City
Music of New York City
Fania Records
1970s in Latin music